Pontrhythallt was a railway station in the village of Pont Rhythallt, Gwynedd, Wales. This station opened in 1869 and closed for regular passenger services in 1930, but trains continued to pass through until the last goods train of all on 3 September 1964, which delivered a panel of lap fencing.

The station was at the end of a nearly five mile climb from crossing the Afon Seiont on the southern edge of Caernarfon. Pontrhythallt's "Home" signal was the first since leaving the town,  earlier.

The 1939 Working timetable shows that some excursions made unadvertised stops at Pontrhythallt.

The line was lifted in early 1965. The station survives as a private dwelling. The bridge over the Afon Rhythallt immediately next to the station has lost its original railway decking, but has been replaced with a footbridge.

References

Sources

External links
 The station on a navigable Edwardian 6" OS map in National Library of Scotland
 The station and line in Rail Map Online
 The station and line CLS with mileages in Railway Codes
 Images of the station in Yahoo
 The station and line in Rail Chronology
 The station and line in Signalling Record Society
 1957 railtour including the line in Manchester Railway Society
 5 May 1957 railtour record in Six Bells Junction

Disused railway stations in Gwynedd
Former London and North Western Railway stations
Railway stations in Great Britain opened in 1869
Railway stations in Great Britain closed in 1930
Llanrug
1869 establishments in Wales